James Wright McGibbon (December 5, 1901 – 10 October 1965) was a timber merchant and federal politician in Quebec.

McGibbon was born in Lachute, Quebec in the Laurentians and was first elected to the House of Commons of Canada in the Canadian federal election in Argenteuil as a Liberal and defeated Conservative incumbent Georges-Henri Héon. McGibbon was, in turn, defeated by Héon in the 1945 federal election.

Prior to entering federal politics, McGibbon was an alderman on the Lachute town council for six years.

External links
 

1901 births
1965 deaths
Liberal Party of Canada MPs
Members of the House of Commons of Canada from Quebec
People from Lachute